The Cook County, Illinois, general election was held on November 8, 1994.

Primaries were held March 15, 1994.

Elections were held for Assessor, Clerk, Sheriff, Treasurer, President of the Cook County Board of Commissioners, all 17 seats of the Cook County Board of Commissioners, both seats of the Cook County Board of Appeals, seats on the Water Reclamation District Board, and judgeships in the Circuit Court of Cook County.

The Democratic Party performed well, winning a full sweep of all countywide offices, and 11 out of 17 seats on the Cook County Board of Commissioners. This came despite 1994 having been a strong Republican election cycle nationally, including in Illinois’ statewide elections (with the national election cycle being dubbed the “Republican Revolution”).

Election information
1994 was a midterm election year in the United States. The primaries and general elections for Cook County races coincided with those for congressional elections and those for state elections.

Voter turnout

Primary election
Turnout in the primaries was 34.58%, with 911,577 ballots cast. Chicago saw 555,937 ballots cast and suburban Cook County saw 23.95% turnout (with 355,620 ballots cast).

General election
The general election saw turnout of 48.16%, with 1,267,152 ballots cast. Chicago saw 586,235 ballots cast, while suburban Cook County saw 50.54% turnout (with 680,917 ballots cast).

Assessor 

In the 1994 Cook County Assessor election, incumbent assessor Thomas Hynes, a Democrat, was elected to a fifth full-term.

Primaries

Democratic

Republican

Harold Washington Party

General election
Democrat Hynes won by a roughly 35-point margin. He defeated Republican nominee Sandra C. Wilson-Muriel, as well as Harold Washington Party nominee Donald Pamon and Populist Party nominee Loretha Weisinger.

Clerk 

In the 1994 Cook County Clerk election, incumbent first-term clerk David Orr, a Democrat, was reelected.

Primaries

Democratic

Republican

Harold Washington Party

General election
David Orr was reelected by a roughly 30-point margin. He defeated Republican nominee Edward Howlett, as well as Harold Washington Party nominee Herman W. Baker, Jr. and Populist Party nominee Curtis Jones.

Sheriff 

In the 1994 Cook County Sheriff election, incumbent first-term sheriff Michael F. Sheahan, a Democrat, was reelected.

Primaries

Democratic

Republican
No candidate ran in the Republican primary for Sheriff. The party ultimately nominated John D. Tourtelot.

Harold Washington Party

General election
Michael F. Sheahan was reelected by a roughly 40-point margin. He defeated Republican nominee John D. Tourtelot, as well as Harold Washington Party nominee William A. Brown and Populist Party nominee William J. Benson.

Treasurer 

In the 1994 Cook County Treasurer election, incumbent fifth-term treasurer Edward J. Rosewell, a Democrat, was reelected.

Primaries

Democratic

Republican

Harold Washington Party

General election
Rosewell was reelected by a more than 20-point margin. He defeated Republican nominee Jean Reyes Pechette, as well as Harold Washington Party nominee Robert J. Pettis and Populist Party nominee John Justice.

President of the Cook County Board of Commissioners 

In the 1994 President of the Cook County Board of Commissioners election, incumbent first-term president Richard Phelan, a Democrat, did not seek reelection. Democrat, John Stroger, was elected to succeed him in office. Stroger was the first African-American to be elected to the office.

Primaries

Democratic

Republican
Joe Morris received the Republican nomination, running unopposed on the ballot in the Republican primary.

Originally, Palatine village president Rita Mullins was running for the nomination, but she withdrew her candidacy.

Harold Washington Party

General election
Morris' candidacy was considered a long shot. It struggled with a lack of funds. During the general election, Stroger did not campaign heavily.

Morris proposed drastically restricting the county's government, abolishing all of the county agencies except the State's Attorney's office and replacing them with a different arrangement of departments that would have been under greater control of the president of the Cook Cook County Board of Commissioners.

Stroger won by a more than 25-point margin over Republican Joe Morris. He also defeated Harold Washington Party nominee Aloysius Majerczyk and Populist Party nominee Jerome Carter.

Cook County Board of Commissioners 

The 1994 Cook County Board of Commissioners election saw all seventeen seats of the Cook County Board of Commissioners up for election to four-year terms.

This was the first for the Cook County Board of Commissioners conducted with individual districts, as previous elections had been conducted through two sets of at-large elections (one for ten seats from the city of Chicago and another for seven seats from suburban Cook County).

Six of those elected were new to the Cook County Board of Commissioners.

The number of commissioners each party held remained unchanged.

1st district

Danny K. Davis, an incumbent Democrat who had served a single term as a commissioner from Chicago at-large, was elected to the 1st district.

Primaries

Democratic
Davis faced no opponents in the Democratic primary.

Republican
No candidates ran in the Republican Party primary.

Harold Washington Party

General election

2nd district

Bobbie L. Steele, an incumbent Democrat who had served two-terms as a commissioner from Chicago at-large, was elected to the 2nd district.

Primaries

Democratic

Republican
No candidates ran in the Republican primary.

Harold Washington Party

General election

3rd district

Jerry Butler, an incumbent Democrat who had served as a commissioner from Chicago at-large for two terms, was elected to the 3rd district.

Primaries

Democratic

Republican
The Republican primary was won by Clara Simms-Johnson, a child protective investigator for the Department of Children and Family Services, who ran unopposed.

Harold Washington Party
No candidates ran in the Harold Washington Party primary.

General election

4th district

John Stroger, an incumbent Democrat who had served six terms as a commissioner from Chicago at-large, was elected to the 4th district.

Primaries

Democratic

Republican
No candidates ran in the Republican primary.

Harold Washington Party
The Harold Washington Party primary was won by Bruce Crosby, a community activist.

General election

5th district

Deborah Sims, a Democrat, was elected to the 5th district.

Primaries

Democratic
Deborah Sims defeated Governors State University political science professor Robert Donaldson in the Democratic primary.

Republican
Lawrence Ragland, an accountant, won the Republican primary.

Harold Washington Party

General election

6th district

Barclay "Bud" Fleming, a Republican, was elected to the 6th district.

Primaries

Democratic
Worth Township supervisor Joan Patricia Murphy won the Democratic primary. Joan Patricia Murphy  had defeated state senator Richard F. Kelly in the Democratic primary.

Republican
Barclay "Bud" Fleming, an engineer who was the village president of Lynwood, won the Republican primary, defeating lawyer Helen Elizabeth Kelly as well as lawyer and East Hazel Crest village president Thomas Brown in the Republican primary.

Harold Washington Party

General election
The district was regarded as a potential "swing district", with both major parties seeing a potential for victory in its election.

7th district

Joseph Mario Moreno, a Democrat, was elected to the 7th district.

Primaries

Democratic

Republican
No candidates ran in the Republican primary.

Harold Washington Party
No candidates ran in the Harold Washington Party primary.

General election

8th district

Roberto Maldonado, a Democrat, was elected to the 8th district.

Primaries

Democratic

Republican
No candidates ran in the Republican primary.

Harold Washington Party
No candidates ran in the Harold Washington Party primary.

General election

9th district

Peter N. Silvestri, a Republican, was elected to the 9th district.

Domico had beaten five other candidates in the Democratic primary.

Silvestri faced no opponents in the Republican primary.

Primaries

Democratic
Marco Domico, who had served two terms as a commissioner from Chicago at-large, won the Democratic primary over seven opponents.

Republican
Elmwood Park village president Peter N. Silvestri won the Republican primary, running unopposed.

Harold Washington Party
No candidates ran in the Harold Washington Party primary.

General election
This district had been regarded as a "swing district", with both major parties being seen as having a chance of winning it.

10th district

Maria Pappas, an incumbent Democrat who had served a single term as a commissioner from Chicago at-large, was elected to the 10th district.

Primaries

Democratic
Pappas defeated three opponents to win the Democratic primary.

Republican
Republican Party nominee John McNeal, an attorney and 48th Ward Republican committeeman, won the Republican primary, running unopposed.

Harold Washington Party

General election

11th district

John P. Daley, an incumbent Democrat that had been appointed a commissioner from Chicago at-large in 1992, was elected to the 11th district.

Primaries

Democratic
John P. Daley defeated communications consultant Dennis Baker in the Democratic primary.

Republican
No candidates ran in the Republican primary.

Harold Washington Party
No candidates ran in the Harold Washington Party primary.

General election

12th district

Ted Lechowicz, an incumbent Democrat who had served two terms as a commissioner from Chicago at-large, was elected to the 12th district.

Primaries

Democratic
Ted Lechowicz defeated two opponents in the Democratic primary.

Republican
No candidates ran in the Republican primary.

Harold Washington Party
No candidates ran in the Harold Washington Party primary.

General election

13th district

Calvin Sutker, a Democrat, was elected to the 13th district.

Primaries

Democratic
Former state representative Calvin Sutker defeated two opponents in the Democratic primary.

Republican
Lourdes Gagui Mon, an educator, won Republican primary.

Harold Washington Party
No candidates ran in the Harold Washington Party primary.

General election

14th district

Richard Siebel, an incumbent Republican who had served several terms as a commissioner from suburban Cook County at-large, was elected to the 14th district. He defeated Democratic nominee Kelly Ann Sheehan.

In the Republican primary, Siebel defeated Palatine village president Rita Mullins.

Primaries

Democratic
No candidates ran in the Democratic primary. The Democratic Party ultimately nominated Kelly Ann Sheehan.

Republican

Harold Washington Party
No candidates ran in the Harold Washington Party primary.

General election

15th district

Carl Hansen, an incumbent Republican who had served five terms as a commissioner from suburban Cook County at-large, was elected to the 15th district.

Primaries

Democratic
No candidates ran in the Democratic primary.

Republican

Harold Washington Party
No candidates ran in the Harold Washington Party primary.

General election

16th district

Allan C. Carr, a incumbent Republican who had served as a commissioner from suburban Cook County at-large.

Primaries

Democratic
Attorney Tony Peraica won the Democratic primary, running unopposed.

Republican

Harold Washington Party
No candidates ran in the Harold Washington Party primary.

General election

17th district

Herb Schumann, an incumbent Republican who had served two terms as a commissioner from suburban Cook County at-large, was elected to the 17th district.

Primaries

Democratic
William Hurley, an insurance agent, won the Democratic primary, running unopposed.

Republican
Herb Schumann defeated lawyer Teressa Nuccio in the Republican primary.

General election

Cook County Board of Appeals 

In the 1994 Cook County Board of Appeals election, both seats on the board were up for election. The election was an at-large election.

Incumbent Democrats Joseph Berrios and Wilson Frost were reelected.

This was the last election to the Cook County Board of Appeals, which was reconstituted in 1998 as the three-member Cook County Board of Review.

Water Reclamation District Board 

In the 1998 Metropolitan Water Reclamation District of Greater Chicago  election took place on November 8, 1994, with primaries on March 15, 1994.

Judicial elections
Partisan elections were held for judgeships on the Circuit Court of Cook County, due to vacancies. Other judgeships had retention elections.

Ballot questions

Property tax cap advisory referendum
An advisory referendum was held on whether the voters of Cook County wanted the Illinois General  Assembly to pass a cap on property taxes. Voters overwhelmingly supported a tax cap.

Other elections
Coinciding with the primaries, elections were held to elect the Democratic, Republican, and Harold Washington Party committeemen for the suburban townships.

Suburban Cook County elected a superintendent for the Suburban Cook County Regional Office of Education, with Republican Lloyd Lehman running unopposed in the general election.

See also 
 1994 Illinois elections

References 

Cook County
Cook County, Illinois elections
Cook County 1994
Cook County
Cook County, Illinois elections